"Zdrobite cătușe" was the national anthem of the Romanian People's Republic between 1948 and 1953. The lyrics were written by Aurel Baranga and the music by Matei Socor.

Lyrics

References

Further reading
Evenimentul Zilei, 15 October 2005, "Cinci regimuri, cinci imnuri"

Socialist Republic of Romania
Historical national anthems
National symbols of Romania
European anthems
Romanian patriotic songs
Romanian-language songs